Slaviša Đukanović (born 3 May 1979) is a Serbian handball player for Saint-Raphaël Handball and the Serbian national team.

References

1979 births
Living people
Serbian male handball players
Handball players from Belgrade
Expatriate handball players
Serbian expatriate sportspeople in France